The Mahindra Roxor is a 4x4 off-road only utility vehicle assembled by Mahindra Automotive North America (MANA) since 2018. MANA is the US arm of Indian automotive company Mahindra and Mahindra Limited. It is based on the Mahindra Thar M2DICR variant, produced and sold in the Indian market since 2010. Mahindra has made off-road vehicles in jeep(GP) pattern since a 1947 contract with Willys to build such vehicles for the Indian market.

The Roxor was announced in November 2017 and began sales on March 2, 2018. In the United States, it is an off-highway side-by-side (SxS). The Roxor is assembled at Mahindra's  factory opened in the year March 2018 located in Auburn Hills, outside Detroit, Michigan. They are sold through power sports dealers across US and Canada.

2022 facelift 
In June 2020, the United States International Trade Commission ruled that the Roxor infringed upon Jeep's trade dress. This decision was accompanied by a limited exclusion order and a cease-and-desist order, effectively barring the import and sale of the Roxor in the US. Mahindra is redesigning the Roxor to further visually distinguish it from Jeep's vehicles. In December 2020, The International Trade Commission issued its final ruling and determined that Mahindra's redesigned 2021 ROXOR does not infringe on the “Jeep Trade Dress” claimed by Fiat Chrysler Automobiles. In November 2021, Mahindra launched the new ROXOR design to the public in the United States.

Design 
The Roxor is based on the design of the Jeep CJ of the 1960's, and Willys CJ of the 1940's. Mahindra was granted a license in 1947 to use the Jeep and CJ trademarks, and Willys originally shipped complete vehicle kits directly to Mahindra. Over time, the vehicles were localized in India. The body design and a significant portion of its mechanical architecture remain largely untouched. In the US off-road UTV market, it has a roll-over protection system (ROPS), which creates the upper body structure and is attached directly to the fully boxed frame. It has a single gauge speedometer on all variants, with digital fuel, odometer, and tachometer gauges.

The Roxor is available in two and four-passenger versions and with either a manual or automatic transmission. It has 16-in steel or aluminum wheels, with options for Goodyear 235/70R16 Wrangler Trailrunner AT, BFGoodrich 235/70R16 All-Terrain T/A KO2, or EFX 30×9.5-16 tires.

Powertrain 
The Roxor is powered by the Mahindra M2DICR  direct-injected turbodiesel engine that produces  @ 3,200rpm and Nm torque at 1,400 rpm and has a compression ratio of 18.6:1. The same engine has also been used in many of Mahindra's other UTV type vehicles.

Drivetrain 

The NGT520 transmission was designed to military specifications. It has a ct-iron housing with a direct-mounted shift system. All of the forward gears are engaged with single-cone brass synchronizers. The simple gear lubrication system is efficient enough under driving conditions to allow limited flat towing of the vehicle over the road. The gears are helical involute. The dual-offset cast-iron transfer case is also based on early military-specified driveline requirements. The 2.46:1 low range allows low crawl speeds over uneven terrain and steep grades. The leaf-sprung straight axles are of a legacy design close to Dana 44 with a 3.73:1 final drive ratio. Since mid-2018, a 6L50 automatic transmission sourced from Punch Powerglide in Strasbourg, France, has been offered as an option on the Mahindra Roxor. The transfer case has what appears to be a PTO cover. Still, a PTO is not able to be installed as there is a support-bearing upgrade in the way. The front and rear differentials are open, allowing easier turning on hard surfaces, but power is sent to the wheel with less traction on loose or off-road surfaces. Several aftermarket suppliers offer traction locking differentials for both front and rear differentials, sending equal power to both wheels for greater traction off-road. Additionally, horsepower output can be increased by installing a less restrictive intake and exhaust system and altering the engine control unit (ECU) tune that controls the fuel/air mixtures to compensate for the increased flow. Turbocharger intercoolers are also available aftermarket, cooling the intake fuel/air mix for greater air density and increased power.

Trademark dispute
Fiat Chrysler Automobiles, owner of the Jeep brand, filed a complaint in August 2018 with the U.S. International Trade Commission to halt sales in the US, saying the design infringed on FCA's copyrights. Mahindra and its Mahindra Automotive North America division filed a public interest statement with the trade commission on August 22, 2018, asserting that the recent complaint filed by FCA U.S. is without merit, and has begun proceedings in a Michigan court to enforce a design agreement that it claims to have executed with Fiat in 2009.

In late 2019, Judge Cameron Elliot ruled in favor of FCA, stating that the International Trade Commission should issue a limited exclusion order (to prevent Mahindra from importing Roxor vehicles or parts) and a cease-and-desist order (to block Mahindra from selling vehicles already in the US). On June 11, 2020, the U. S. International Trade Commission affirmed the decision. The ITC did not find that the Roxor's grill infringes upon Jeep's trademarked 7-slot grill. Rather, the vehicle overall infringes upon Jeep's trade dress used formerly in their CJ series vehicles, and currently on their Wrangler series vehicles. In particular, the Roxor has "a boxy body shape with flat vertical sides, rear body panels that are roughly the same height as the hood, the door cut-outs that go above the bottom of the side, exterior hood latches, a mostly flat and rounded-edge hood tapering toward the front... and the trapezoidal flared fenders that extend past the grille."

While Mahindra has often highlighted the differences between the Roxor and the Jeep, the ITC ruling has caused them to embark on a redesign of the vehicle. Acknowledging the Roxor's similarities to Jeep vehicles, Rick Haas, Mahindra Automotive North America CEO and President, stated that the Roxor is "actually a CJ," and that "everyone understands that our vehicle is a CJ."

In December 2020, the International Trade Commission issued its final ruling and determined that Mahindra's redesigned 2021 ROXOR does not infringe on the “Jeep Trade Dress” claimed by Fiat Chrysler Automobiles.

References

External links
 Official North American website
 Official Canadian website vehicles blaze

Jeep platforms
Roxor
Off-road vehicles